The 2017 Handzame Classic was the 7th edition of the Handzame Classic road cycling one day race. It was held on 17 March 2017 as part of the 2017 UCI Europe Tour in category 1.1.

Teams
Twenty-two teams of up to eight riders started the race:

Result

References 

Handzame Classic
Handzame Classic
Handzame Classic